Monte Sibilla is a mountain of Marche, Italy. It resides in the southeast corner of the Sibillini Mountains National Park, a branch of the Central Italian Apennines. It is associated with the Italian version of the legend of Sebile (Sibilla).

Mountains of Marche
Mountains of the Apennines